Platyurosternarchus is a genus of ghost knifefishes found in the Amazon, Orinoco and Essequibo river basins in tropical South America. They are typically found in streams or near the shore of rivers, often among submerged tree trunks and branches over a leaf-covered bottom where they find their invertebrate prey.

Species
There are two currently recognized species:

 Platyurosternarchus crypticus de Santana & Vari, 2009
 Platyurosternarchus macrostomus (Günther, 1870)

References

Apteronotidae
Fish of South America
Taxa named by Francisco Mago Leccia
Freshwater fish genera